There are 13 named mountain summits in Dawson County, Montana.
 Blue Mountain, el. 
 Bryants Buttes, el. 
 Clay Butte, el. 
 Cluster Buttes, el. 
 Crazy Butte, el. 
 Custers Lookout, el. 
 Diamond G Butte, el. 
 Glendive Butte, el. 
 High Point, el. 
 Mount Antelope, el. 
 Rattlesnake Butte, el. 
 Twin Buttes, el. 
 Woodworth Hill, el.

See also
 List of mountains in Montana
 List of mountain ranges in Montana

Notes

Landforms of Dawson County, Montana
Dawson